Elias Barakat Freije (born 28 March 1980) is a Lebanese former footballer who played as a goalkeeper. He represented Lebanon internationally.

Honours
Nejmeh
Lebanese Premier League: 2008–09

References

External links
 
 

1980 births
Living people
People from Zahle District
Lebanese footballers
Association football goalkeepers
Sagesse SC footballers
Nejmeh SC players
Akhaa Ahli Aley FC players
Racing Club Beirut players
Lebanese Premier League players
Lebanon international footballers